The following is a list of jazz albums, alphabetized by album titles.

A

 Africa/Brass – John Coltrane
 Afro Blue Impressions – John Coltrane
 Afro-Harping - Dorothy Ashby
 Agharta - Miles Davis
 Air - Cecil Taylor
 Air Above Mountains - Cecil Taylor
 Akisakila -Cecil Taylor
 Alqgonquin - Cecil Taylor
 All Alone - Ron Carter
 All Blues - Ron Carter
 All Kinds of Time - Karl Berger & Dave Holland
 Almeda - Cecil Taylor
 Alms/Tiergarten (Spree) - Cecil Taylor
 Alone Together - Ron Carter & Jim Hall
 Always a Pleasure - Cecil Taylor
 Amandla – Miles Davis
 Andrew!!! - Andrew Hill
 Angels and Demons at Play – Sun Ra
 A.R.C. - Barry Altschul, Chick Corea & Dave Holland
 Anything Goes - Ron Carter
 The Art of the Trio Volume One – Brad Mehldau Trio
 Asante - McCoy Tyner
 Ascenseur pour l'échafaud - Miles Davis
 Ascension – John Coltrane
 At Carnegie Hall – Thelonious Monk Quartet with John Coltrane
 Aura – Miles Davis
 The Avant-Garde (album) – Don Cherry & John Coltrane

B

 Bags' Groove – Miles Davis
 Bahia – John Coltrane
 Ballads – John Coltrane
 Bar Kokhba Sextet –  50th Birthday Celebration
 A Beautiful Day - Andrew Hill
 The Believer – John Coltrane
 Beyond the Missouri Sky (Short Stories) – Charlie Haden & Pat Metheny
 Beyond the Sound Barrier – Wayne Shorter Quartet
 Big Fun – Miles Davis
 Birth of the Cool – Miles Davis
 Bitches Brew – Miles Davis
 Black Beauty: Miles Davis at Fillmore West - Miles Davis
 Black Fire - Andrew Hill
 Black Pearls – John Coltrane
 Black Codes (From the Underground) – Wynton Marsalis
 The Black Saint and the Sinner Lady - Charles Mingus
 Blowin' the Blues Away – Horace Silver
 Blue Black - Andrew Hill
 The Blues and the Abstract Truth – Oliver Nelson
 Blue Haze – Miles Davis
 Blue Moods – Miles Davis
 Blue Period – Miles Davis
 Blue Train – John Coltrane
 Blue World – John Coltrane
 Blues Farm - Ron Carter
 Blues and the Soulful Truth - Leon Thomas
 Both Directions at Once: The Lost Album – John Coltrane
 But Not Farewell - Andrew Hill
 Bye Bye Blackbird – John Coltrane

C

 Candy – Lee Morgan
 Caravan – Art Blakey and the Jazz Messengers
 Caramba! – Lee Morgan
 The Cat – Jimmy Smith
 The Cats – Kenny Burrell, John Coltrane, Tommy Flanagan & Idrees Sulieman 
 Cattin' with Coltrane and Quinichette – John Coltrane & Paul Quinichette
 The Cat Walk – Donald Byrd
 Coltrane's Sound – John Coltrane
 Charisma – Lee Morgan
 The Circle Maker – John Zorn & Masada
 City Lights – Lee Morgan
 Collectors' Items – Miles Davis
 Coltrane (1957) – John Coltrane
 Coltrane (1962) – John Coltrane
 Coltrane Jazz – John Coltrane
 Coltrane Plays the Blues – John Coltrane
 Coltrane's Sound – John Coltrane
 The Complete 1961 Village Vanguard Recordings – John Coltrane
 The Complete Jack Johnson Sessions- Miles Davis
 The Compositions of Al Cohn – Miles Davis
 Compulsion - Andrew Hill
 Conception - Miles Davis, Stan Getz, Lee Konitz & Gerry Mulligan
 Conference of the Birds – Dave Holland Quartet
 Contours - Sam Rivers
 The Cooker – Lee Morgan
 Cookin' – Miles Davis
 Cornbread – Lee Morgan
 Cosmic Music – Alice Coltrane & John Coltrane
 Crescent – John Coltrane
 Crossings – Herbie Hancock

D

 Dakar – John Coltrane
 Dance with Death - Andrew Hill
 Dark Magus - Miles Davis
 Decoy – Miles Davis
 Dedication – Herbie Hancock
 Deep Purple – Sun Ra
 Delightfulee – Lee Morgan
 Dialogue – Bobby Hutcherson
 Dig – Miles Davis
 Divine Revelation - Andrew Hill
 Dizzy Atmosphere – Al Grey, Wynton Kelly, Billy Mitchell, Lee Morgan, Charlie Persip, Billy Root & Paul West
 Doo-Bop – Miles Davis
 Dreams So Real - Gary Burton
 Duke Ellington & John Coltrane – John Coltrane & Duke Ellington
 Dusk - Andrew Hill
 Duster - Gary Burton

E

 E.S.P. – Miles Davis
 East Broadway Run Down – Sonny Rollins
 Easy Living – Ella Fitzgerald
 Echoes of a Friend - McCoy Tyner
 Ella – Ella Fitzgerald
 Ella Abraça Jobim – Ella Fitzgerald
 Ella Fitzgerald Sings Songs from "Let No Man Write My Epitaph" – Ella Fitzgerald
 Ella Fitzgerald Sings Sweet Songs for Swingers – Ella Fitzgerald
 Ella Fitzgerald Sings the Cole Porter Songbook – Ella Fitzgerald
 Ella Fitzgerald Sings the Duke Ellington Songbook – Ella Fitzgerald
 Ella Fitzgerald Sings the George and Ira Gershwin Songbook – Ella Fitzgerald
 Ella Fitzgerald Sings the Harold Arlen Songbook – Ella Fitzgerald
 Ella Fitzgerald Sings the Irving Berlin Songbook – Ella Fitzgerald
 Ella Fitzgerald Sings the Jerome Kern Songbook – Ella Fitzgerald
 Ella Fitzgerald Sings the Johnny Mercer Songbook – Ella Fitzgerald
 Ella Fitzgerald Sings the Rodgers & Hart Songbook – Ella Fitzgerald
 Ella Fitzgerald and Billie Holiday at Newport – Ella Fitzgerald
 Ella Fitzgerald live at Mister Kelly's – Ella Fitzgerald
 Empyrean Isles – Herbie Hancock
 Enlightenment - McCoy Tyner
 E.S.P. – Miles Davis
 Eternity - Alice Coltrane
 The European Tour – John Coltrane
 Everybody Digs Bill Evans – Bill Evans
 Expansions - McCoy Tyner
 Expoobident – Lee Morgan
 Expression – John Coltrane
 Extensions - McCoy Tyner

F

 Fat Albert Rotunda – Herbie Hancock
 Filles de Kilimanjaro – Miles Davis
 First Meditations – John Coltrane
 Flood – Herbie Hancock
 Four & More - Miles Davis
 Fuchsia Swing Song - Sam Rivers

G

 Gary Burton & Keith Jarrett - Gary Burton & Keith Jarrett
 The George Benson Cookbook – George Benson
 A Genuine Tong Funeral - Gary Burton
 Get Up with It – Miles Davis
 Giant Steps – John Coltrane
 The Gigolo – Lee Morgan
 Genius of Modern Music, Vol. 1 – Thelonious Monk
 Getz/Gilberto –  Stan Getz and João Gilberto

H

 Here's Lee Morgan – Lee Morgan
 Head Hunters – Herbie Hancock
 Hip Harp - Dorothy Ashby
 Hot Fives & Sevens – Louis Armstrong
 Huntington Ashram Monastery - Alice Coltrane

I

 Illuminations - Alice Coltrane & Carlos Santana
 Impressions – John Coltrane
 In A Silent Way – Miles Davis
 Inception - McCoy Tyner
 In Concert - Miles Davis
 Infinity – Lee Morgan
 In Person Friday and Saturday Nights at the Blackhawk, Complete - Miles Davis
 Interstellar Space – John Coltrane
 Introducing Lee Morgan – Lee Morgan
 Inventions and Dimensions – Herbie Hancock

J

 Jack Johnson – Miles Davis
 Jazz på svenska – Jan Johansson
 Jazz Track – Miles Davis
 Jazz Way Out – John Coltrane & Wilbur Harden
 John Coltrane and Johnny Hartman – John Coltrane & Johnny Hartman
 John Coltrane with the Red Garland Trio – John Coltrane
 The John Coltrane Quartet Plays – John Coltrane
 Journey in Satchidananda - Alice Coltrane

K

 Karma - Pharoah Sanders
 Kenny Burrell & John Coltrane – Kenny Burrell & John Coltrane
 Kind of Blue – Miles Davis
 The Koln Concert - Keith Jarrett
 Kulu Sé Mama – John Coltrane

L

 Lanquidity – Sun Ra
 The Last Session – Lee Morgan
 The Last Trane – John Coltrane
 Lee Morgan Indeed! – Lee Morgan
 Lee Morgan Sextet – Lee Morgan
 Lee Morgan Vol. 3 – Lee Morgan
 Lee-Way – Lee Morgan
 Lennie Tristano – Lennie Tristano
 Like Someone in Love – Ella Fitzgerald
 Lady Day – Billie Holiday
 Live Around the World - Miles Davis
 Live at the Barrel - Miles Davis & Jimmy Forrest
 Live at Birdland – John Coltrane
 Live at Montreux - Miles Davis
 Live at Newport - McCoy Tyner
 Live at the Half Note: One Down, One Up – John Coltrane
 Live at the Lighthouse – Lee Morgan
 Live! at the Village Vanguard – John Coltrane
 Live at the Village Vanguard Again! – John Coltrane
 Live-Evil – Miles Davis
 Live in Antibes – John Coltrane
 Live in Japan – John Coltrane
 Live in Paris – John Coltrane
 Live in Seattle – John Coltrane
 Live in Sevilla 2000 – Masada
 Living Field – The Pillows
 Living Space – John Coltrane
 Lord of Lords - Alice Coltrane
 Lou's Blues – Lou Marini and the Magic City Jazz Orchestra
 Lofty Fake Anagram - Gary Burton
 A Love Supreme – John Coltrane
 Lush Life – John Coltrane

M

 Maiden Voyage – Herbie Hancock
 Mainstream 1958 – John Coltrane & Wilbur Harden
 The Magic Hour – Wynton Marsalis
 Man-Child – Herbie Hancock
 The Man with the Horn – Miles Davis
 McCoy Tyner Plays Ellington - McCoy Tyner
 Meditations – John Coltrane
 Meets the Rhythm Section – Art Pepper
 Metheny/Mehldau – Pat Metheny & Brad Mehldau
 Midnight Blue – Kenny Burrell
 Miles Ahead – Miles Davis
 Miles & Monk at Newport - Miles Davis & Thelonious Monk
 Miles & Quincy Live at Montreux - Miles Davis & Quincy Jones
 Miles Davis All Star Sextet – Miles Davis
 Miles Davis All Stars, Volume 1 – Miles Davis
 Miles Davis All Stars, Volume 2 – Miles Davis
 Miles Davis and Horns – Miles Davis
 Miles Davis and the Modern Jazz Giants – Miles Davis
 Miles Davis in Europe - Miles Davis
 Miles Davis Quartet – Miles Davis
 Miles Davis Quintet – Miles Davis
 Miles Davis Volume 2 – Miles Davis
 Miles Davis, Volume 3 – Miles Davis
 Miles Davis with Sonny Rollins – Miles Davis
 Miles in Berlin - Miles Davis
 Miles in the Sky – Miles Davis
 Miles in Tokyo - Miles Davis
 Miles Smiles – Miles Davis
 Miles: The New Miles Davis Quintet – Miles Davis
 Milestones – Miles Davis
 Mingus Ah Um – Charles Mingus
 Mingus Mingus Mingus Mingus Mingus – Charles Mingus
 Moanin' – Art Blakey and the Jazz Messengers
 Momentum – Joshua Redman
 A Monastic Trio - Alice Coltrane
 Music from Siesta - Miles Davis & Marcus Miller
 The Musings of Miles – Miles Davis
 Mwandishi – Herbie Hancock
 My Favorite Things – John Coltrane
 My Favorite Things: Coltrane at Newport – John Coltrane
 My Funny Valentine - Miles Davis
 My Point of View – Herbie Hancock

N

 Nefertiti – Miles Davis
 Never No Lament: The Blanton-Webster Band – Duke Ellington
 New Concepts of Artistry in Rhythm – Stan Kenton and His Orchestra
 Newport '63 – John Coltrane
 The New Sounds – Miles Davis
 New Thing at Newport – John Coltrane & Archie Shepp
 New York – Barcelona Crossings – Brad Mehldau Trio & Perico Sambeat
 A Night in Tunisia – Art Blakey and the Jazz Messengers
 Nights of Ballads & Blues - McCoy Tyner
 Night Train – The Oscar Peterson Trio

O

 Offering: Live at Temple University – John Coltrane
 The Okeh Ellington – Duke Ellington
 The Olatunji Concert: The Last Live Recording – John Coltrane
 Olé Coltrane – John Coltrane
 Om – John Coltrane
 On the Corner – Miles Davis
 Out Front - Booker Little
 Out to Lunch! – Eric Dolphy
 Out of the Cool – Gil Evans Orchestra

P

 Pangaea - Miles Davis
 The Paris Concert – John Coltrane
 Peckin' Time – Lee Morgan
 Point of Departure – Andrew Hill
 Porgy and Bess – Miles Davis
 The Prisoner – Herbie Hancock
 The Procrastinator – Lee Morgan
 Ptah, the El Daoud - Alice Coltrane

Q

 Quiet Nights – Miles Davis & Gil Evans
 Quintet / Sextet – Miles Davis & Milt Jackson

R

 Radha-Krsna Nama Sankirtana - Alice Coltrane
 The Rajah – Lee Morgan
 Reaching Fourth - McCoy Tyner
 The Real McCoy - McCoy Tyner
 Relaxin' – Miles Davis
 Return to Forever – Chick Corea
 Root Down – Jimmy Smith
 'Round About Midnight – Miles Davis
 Rubberband – Miles Davis
 The Rumproller- McCoy Tyner

S

 Sanhedrin 1994-1997 – Masada
 Sahara - McCoy Tyner
 Search for the New Land – Lee Morgan
 Secrets – Herbie Hancock
 Selflessness: Featuring My Favorite Things – John Coltrane
 Settin' the Pace – John Coltrane
 Seven Steps to Heaven – Miles Davis
 Sextant – Herbie Hancock
 The Shape of Jazz to Come – Ornette Coleman
 The Sidewinder – Lee Morgan
 The Sixth Sense – Lee Morgan
 Sketches of Spain – Miles Davis
 Smokin' at the Half Note – Wes Montgomery and the Wynton Kelly Trio
 Someday My Prince Will Come – Miles Davis
 Something in Common - Houston Person & Ron Carter
 Song for My Father – Horace Silver
 Song for My Lady - McCoy Tyner
 Songs of Berlin - Marc Secara and the Berlin Jazz Orchestra
 A Song for You - Ron Carter
 Sonic Boom – Lee Morgan
 Sonore – Peter Brötzmann, Ken Vandermark & Mats Gustafsson
 Sorcerer – Miles Davis
 Soultrane – John Coltrane
 So What? - Ron Carter
 Spanish Blue - Ron Carter
 Speak Like a Child – Herbie Hancock
 Spiritual Unity – Albert Ayler
 Standard Bearers - Ron Carter
 Standard Coltrane – John Coltrane
 Standards – Lee Morgan
 Stardust – John Coltrane
 Star People – Miles Davis
 Steamin' – Miles Davis
 Stellar Regions – John Coltrane
 Sunday at the Village Vanguard - Bill Evans Trio
 Sun Ship – John Coltrane
 Suspicious Activity? – The Bad Plus

T

 Take Twelve – Lee Morgan
 Takin' Off – Herbie Hancock
 Tanganyika Strut – John Coltrane & Wilbur Harden
 Taru – Lee Morgan
 Tears for Dolphy – Ted Curson
 Tender Moments - McCoy Tyner
 Thrust – Herbie Hancock
 Time for Tyner - McCoy Tyner
 Timeless – John Abercrombie, Jack DeJohnette & Jan Hammer
 T'Estimo Tant – Tete Montoliu
 Time Out – Dave Brubeck Quartet
 Time Further Out – Dave Brubeck Quartet
 Today and Tomorrow - McCoy Tyner
 Tom Cat – Lee Morgan
 Transfiguration - Alice Coltrane
 Translinear Light - Alice Coltrane
 Transition – John Coltrane
 Transcendence - Alice Coltrane
 A Tribute to Jack Johnson - Miles Davis
 Tutu – Miles Davis
 Two of a Mind – Paul Desmond & Gerry Mulligan

U

 Urlicht/Primal Light – Gustav Mahler & Uri Caine
 Underground –  Thelonious Monk
 Universal Consciousness - Alice Coltrane
 Uptown Conversation - Ron Carter

V
 Voice of Chunk –  The Lounge Lizards

W

 Walkin' – Miles Davis
 Water Babies – Miles Davis
 We Want Miles - Miles Davis
 Where? - Ron Carter
 Winter in Venice – Esbjörn Svensson Trio
 We Insist! Max Roach's Freedom Now Suite – Max Roach et al.
 Welcome to Hungary! The Tommy Vig Orchestra 2012 Featuring David Murray – Tommy Vig
 What Is There to Say? – Gerry Mulligan
 Workin' – Miles Davis
 World Galaxy - Alice Coltrane

Y

 Young Man with a Horn – Miles Davis
 You're Under Arrest – Miles Davis

See also
 List of jazz fusion recordings

External links
 Double Time Top 100 Historically Significant Recordings (by Jamey Aebersold)
 Penguin Guide to Jazz: Crown Albums List (1st – 8th editions; not affiliated with the publisher or authors)
 Penguin Guide to Jazz: Core Collection List (1st – 8th editions; not affiliated with the publisher or authors)

 
Lists of albums by genre